Nima Wangdi (born 6 December 1998), also known as Chutur, is a Bhutanese international footballer. He made his first appearance in their 2019 AFC Asian Cup qualifying match against Bangladesh, being named in the starting lineup and playing the whole game, and also played the whole game in the second leg of the tie. He currently plays for Thimphu City FC as a defender.

References

External links

Bhutanese footballers
Bhutan international footballers
Living people
Association football forwards
1998 births